The Tashkent Cycling Team was an Uzbek UCI Continental cycling team established in 2018.

Team roster
As at 31 December 2018

References

Cycling teams based in Uzbekistan
Cycling teams established in 2018
UCI Continental Teams (Europe)
Defunct cycling teams